Manuel José Blanco y Calvo de Encalada (April 21, 1790 – September 5, 1876) was a vice-admiral in the Chilean Navy, a political figure, and Chile's first President (Provisional) (1826).

Biography
Born in Buenos Aires which was the capital of the Viceroyalty of the Río de la Plata, Blanco Encalada was the son of the Spanish Manuel Lorenzo Blanco Cicerón and of the Chilean Mercedes Calvo de Encalada y Recabarren.  He was trained for the navy in Spain. Later, during the Chilean War of Independence, he joined the Chilean forces, where he served with distinction under Lord Cochrane and rose to rank of Vice-Admiral and commander of the Chilean forces in (1825), where he participated in the capture of Chiloé. The following year, Congress elected him to the newly established position of President of the Republic. He soon had several fights with Congress, which was trying to install a federalist system, and resigned within two months.

Later, he joined the wars against the Peruvian-Bolivian Confederation and Spanish-South American War (1865–1866). After the war, he became Governor of Valparaíso and minister to France. He was also an active Freemason. Blanco Encalada died in Santiago de Chile at the age of 86.

Cabinet

See also

See Chilean ship Blanco Encalada for the ships named in honor of Manuel Blanco Encalada.
Ventura Blanco Encalada
Biography

References

1790 births
1876 deaths
People from Buenos Aires
Argentine people of Chilean descent
Chilean people of Spanish descent
Argentine emigrants to Chile
Presidents of Chile
Chilean admirals
Ambassadors of Chile to France
Chilean diplomats
Chilean Freemasons
Chilean Navy personnel of the War of the Confederation
Chilean Navy personnel of the Chincha Islands War
19th-century Chilean Navy personnel
Candidates for President of Chile
Chilean Navy personnel of the Spanish American wars of independence
Naturalized citizens of Chile